
Year 219 BC was a year of the pre-Julian Roman calendar. At the time it was known as the Year of the Consulship of Paullus and Salinator (or, less frequently, year 535 Ab urbe condita). The denomination 219 BC for this year has been used since the early medieval period, when the Anno Domini calendar era became the prevalent method in Europe for naming years.

Events 
 By place 

 Egypt 
 Following the defection of one of Ptolemy IV's leading commanders, Egypt's Syrian territories are seriously threatened by Antiochus III, thus initiating the Fourth Syrian War. When the Seleucid ruler captures the important eastern Mediterranean sea ports of Seleucia-in-Pieria, Tyre, and Ptolemais, Ptolemy IV's advisor, Sosibius, and the Ptolemaic court enter into delaying negotiations with the enemy, while the Ptolemaic army is reorganized and intensively drilled.
 The former King of Sparta, Cleomenes III, escapes from his Egyptian prison and, after failing to raise a revolt in Alexandria, takes his own life.

 Roman Republic 
 The Romans extend their area of domination around the head of the Adriatic Sea as far as the peninsula of Histria by the conquest of peoples who dwell to the east of the Veneti. Thus, with the exception of Liguria and the upper valley of the Po River, all Italy south of the Alps is brought within the Roman sphere.

 Carthage 
 Hannibal lays siege to Saguntum thus initiating the Second Punic War between Carthage and Rome. Saguntum is an independent Iberian Peninsula city south of the Ebro River. In the treaty between Rome and Carthage concluded in 226 BC, the Ebro had been set as the northern limit of Carthaginian influence in the Iberian Peninsula. Saguntum is south of the Ebro, but the Romans have "friendship" with the city and regard the Carthaginian attack on it as an act of war. The siege of Saguntum lasts eight months, and in it Hannibal is severely wounded. The Romans, who send envoys to Carthage in protest, demand the surrender of Hannibal.

 Greece 
 The Roman Senate sends the consul Lucius Aemilius Paullus to Illyria with an army. On discovering Rome's intent, the Illyrian leader Demetrius of Pharos puts to death those Illyrians who oppose his rule, fortifies Dimale and goes to Pharos. After a seven-day siege by the Roman fleet under Lucius Aemilius Paulus, Dimale is taken by direct assault. From Dimale, the Roman navy heads to Pharos, where the Roman forces rout the Illyrians. Demetrius flees to Macedonia, where he becomes a trusted councilor at the court of King Philip V.
 The Cretan city of Kydonia joins the Aetolian alliance.

 China 
 Qin Shi Huang orders his generals to capture present-day Guangdong and Guangxi.

Births

Deaths 
 Cleomenes III, Spartan king from 235 BC to 222 BC, who reorganized Sparta's political structure and struggled unsuccessfully to destroy the Achaean League.

References